Candlish is a Scottish surname. Notable people with the surname include:

 James Smith Candlish (1835–1892), Scottish minister, son of Robert
 John Candlish (1816–1874), British glass bottle manufacturer and Liberal Party politician
 Louise Candlish, British author
 Robert Smith Candlish (1806–1873), Scottish minister, father of James

See also 

 McCandlish – a related surname

Scottish surnames